Diego Hidalgo and Nicolás Jarry were the defending champions but only Hidalgo chose to defend his title, partnering Sergio Galdós. Hidalgo lost in the quarterfinals to Hans Hach Verdugo and Miguel Ángel Reyes-Varela.

Evan King and Max Schnur won the title after defeating Hach Verdugo and Reyes-Varela 3–6, 7–6(7–3), [16–14] in the final.

Seeds

Draw

References

External links
 Main draw

Challenger de Santiago III - Doubles
2021 Doubles